"I Would Die 4 U" is a song by Prince and the Revolution, the fourth single in the US from their 1984 album, Purple Rain. The up-tempo dance song was a top 10 hit—the final one from the album—in the US, reaching number 8 on the Billboard Hot 100.

The song's lyrics evoke Jesus Christ's message to his followers: "U—I would die 4 U, darling if U want me 2"; as well as, "if you're evil I'll forgive you", "all I really need is 2 know that U believe," and, "I'm your messiah and you're the reason why."

Cash Box called the song "a practice in restrained ecstasy" in which "Prince delivers one of his finest and most passionate...vocal performances."  Billboard called it "electrifying", saying that "the nervous excitement zaps like a high-tension wire."

"I Would Die 4 U" is often played in sequence with "Baby I'm a Star", the track following it, on Purple Rain. As of April 30, 2016, it has sold 561,772 copies in the United States.

"Another Lonely Christmas" 
The B-side, "Another Lonely Christmas", is a melancholy account of a man mourning his lover, who had died from pneumonia on a previous Christmas Day. Prince recorded "Another Lonely Christmas" in February 1984. Although during that period of his life Prince was socially very solitary, he insisted that "Another Lonely Christmas" was a fictional story. The song has been compared to the song "Sometimes It Snows in April," from the 1986 album Parade. He performed "Another Lonely Christmas" live only one time, on the day after Christmas, December 26, 1984, at the St. Paul Civic Center in Minnesota.

Alternate versions
The extended version of "I Would Die 4 U" is actually a rehearsal jam on the song with The Revolution and musicians from Sheila E.'s band, Eddie M (on sax) and Miko Weaver (guitar), along with Sheila E. herself recorded some time before the Purple Rain Tour. The jam features some overdubbing and fades at the end; a longer version, nearly 31 minutes long, was never released officially, but has been bootlegged. The extended mix was also used as the B-side of the 1989 "Erotic City" single (the artwork of which features the same image of Prince that was used for this single's cover).

The B-side of the UK 12" single release includes "Another Lonely Christmas" as well as the 1999 track "Free".

Personnel
 Prince – lead and background vocals and various instruments
 Wendy Melvoin – guitar, vocals
 Lisa Coleman – keyboards, vocals
 Matt Fink – keyboards
 Brown Mark – bass
 Bobby Z. – drums, percussion

Track listing

7": Paisley Park / 7-29121 (US)
 "I Would Die 4 U" (Single version) – 3:03
 "Another Lonely Christmas" – 4:51

12": Paisley Park / 9 20291-0 (US)
 "I Would Die 4 U" (Extended version) – 10:15
 "Another Lonely Christmas" (extended version) – 6:47

12": Warner Bros. / W9121T (UK)
 "I Would Die 4 U" (Single version) – 2:57
 "Another Lonely Christmas" – 4:51
 "Free" – 5:00

Charts

Weekly charts

Year-end charts

References

External links
 Dedicated Prince site featuring... "I Would Die 4 U" lyrics and B-side track... "Another Lonely Christmas" lyrics

Prince (musician) songs
1984 singles
Songs written by Prince (musician)
Warner Records singles
Song recordings produced by Prince (musician)
1984 songs
Songs written for films
Songs about death